Edward Fitzgerald Barry (3 September 1905 – 12 December 1993) was a New Zealand rugby union player. A loose forward, Barry represented Wellington and, briefly, Wanganui at a provincial level, and was a member of the New Zealand national side, the All Blacks, in 1932 and 1934. He played 10 matches for the All Blacks including one international, against Australia in 1934.

A police officer, Barry had postings in Pahiatua, Whitianga, Orewa, and Auckland, where he was active as a coach and administrator at club and provincial union levels.

He holds a unique place in New Zealand rugby history in that both his son, Kevin Barry, and grandson, Liam Barry, also played for the All Blacks: in doing so they became the first family to provide All Blacks from three successive generations. He also had another son, Pat, who played for Counties in the 1960s, and another grandson, Mike Barry, who represented North Auckland and North Harbour.

References

1905 births
1993 deaths
People from Temuka
New Zealand rugby union players
New Zealand international rugby union players
Wellington rugby union players
Rugby union flankers
New Zealand people of Irish descent
Rugby union players from Canterbury, New Zealand